The Midland Railway 2501 Class was a class of 2-6-0 steam locomotives built in the United States in 1899.  The Midland's own Derby Works had reached their capacity, and were unable to produce additional engines at the time, and many British locomotive builders were recovering from a labor dispute over working hours, thus the railway placed an order with the Baldwin Locomotive Works for 30 engines.  The engines were shipped disassembled as kits of parts, and re-assembled at Derby.  Baldwin constructed similar 2-6-0's for the Great Central Railway and Great Northern Railway around the same time.

Appearance
The engines were designed with little or no consideration to British practice, having several distinct characteristics of American practice, such as the use of bar frames, sand carried in a second dome on top of the boiler, and eight-wheel bogie tenders. A further 10 engines were ordered from the Schenectady Locomotive Works, which became the 2511 Class.

Numbering
Originally Nos 2501–2510, 2521–2540, in the Midland's 1907 renumbering scheme, the Baldwins became Nos 2200–2229, in the same order.

Withdrawal
Being non-standard, they had a short life and were all withdrawn between November 1908 and March 1914. All were scrapped.

References 

 
 
 
 Hunt, Dave. American Locomotives of the Midland Railway (No 1 Supplement to Midland Record) 

2501 Class
2-6-0 locomotives
Baldwin locomotives
Railway locomotives introduced in 1899